Värmdö-Evlinge is a locality situated in Värmdö Municipality, Stockholm County, Sweden with 559 inhabitants in 2010.

References 

Populated places in Värmdö Municipality